The second series of Waterloo Road, a British television school drama series, created by Ann McManus and Maureen Chadwick and produced by BBC Scotland and Shed Productions, commenced airing in the United Kingdom on 18 January 2007 and concluded after 12 episodes on 26 April 2007.

Waterloo Road's second series aired in the United Kingdom on Thursdays at 8:00 pm GMT on BBC One, a terrestrial television network, where it received an average of 4.80 million viewers per episode.

Plot
The show follows the lives of the teachers and the pupils at the eponymous school of Waterloo Road, a failing inner-city comprehensive, tackling a wide range of issues often seen as taboo such as bullying, alcoholism, multiple sclerosis, losing a baby, an affair between a teacher and a pupil, online abuse, overactive bladder syndrome, suicide, knife crime and drug abuse.

Premise
Following the events of the series one finale, it is revealed that English teacher Lorna Dickey (Camilla Power) survived what was portrayed as a suicide attempt. Her former husband Tom Clarkson (Jason Done) and previous best friend Izzie Redpath (Jill Halfpenny) continue their relationship, with Izzie now pregnant, making life in the staff room very difficult for all parties and even more so when tragedy strikes for both Tom and Izzie and Lorna, who is diagnosed with multiple sclerosis.

The second series included the arrival of prospective school governor Roger Aspinall (Nick Sidi), who promised to invest in the future of the school in return for a seat on the governing body, having got the final decision back from the LEA at the end of series one that the school would remain open. Roger's son Brett (Tom Payne) enrolls at the school and is later involved in one of the major plots this series when he starts an affair with the new, glamorous school secretary, Davina Shackleton (Christine Tremarco).

Other major plots were the drug-dealing antics of two pupils which later ends in the violent stabbing of one of the school's teachers, the alcoholism of trainee teacher Russell Millen, the bullying and attempted suicide of Mika Grainger (Lauren Drummond) and the return of former pupil Maxine Barlow (Ellie Paskell), who is later fostered by the school's French teacher Steph Haydock (Denise Welch).

The series ended with the school's board of governors preparing to make a decision on who should take up the position of becoming Waterloo Road's Head on a permanent basis.

Cast

Staff
 Jason Merrells as Jack Rimmer; Headteacher (12 episodes)
 Jamie Glover as Andrew Treneman; Deputy Headteacher and English teacher (12 episodes)
 Angela Griffin as Kim Campbell; Head of Pastoral Care and Art teacher (12 episodes)
 Jason Done as Tom Clarkson; English teacher (12 episodes)
 Jill Halfpenny as Izzie Redpath; Head of Drama and English teacher (12 episodes)
 Denise Welch as Steph Haydock; Head of French (12 episodes)
 Christine Tremarco as Davina Shackleton; School secretary (12 episodes)
 Philip Martin Brown as Grantly Budgen; Head of English (11 episodes)
 Camilla Power as Lorna Dickey; English teacher (10 episodes)
 Nick Sidi as Roger Aspinall; Investor (7 episodes)

Pupils
 Adam Thomas as Donte Charles (12 episodes) 
 Katie Griffiths as Chlo Grainger (12 episodes) 
 Lauren Drummond as Mika Grainger (12 episodes)
 Tom Payne as Brett Aspinall (12 episodes)
 Chelsee Healey as Janeece Bryant (9 episodes)
 Ellie Paskell as Maxine Barlow (8 episodes)
 Craig Fitzpatrick as Lewis Seddon; ex-pupil (7 episodes)
 Zeriozha Burtt-Skeete as Celine Dixon (4 episodes)
 Holly Grainger as Stacey Appleyard (4 episodes)
 Holly Matthews as Leigh-Ann Galloway (3 episodes)

Others

Recurring
 Mikey North as Helmsley; Lewis' friend (4 episodes)
 Robert Angell as Nigel Hinchcliffe; Chair of Governors (2 episodes)
 Paul Birchard as Jerry Preston; Investor (2 episodes)
 Kathryn Hunt as Gemma Seddon; Drug dealer and Lewis' aunt (2 episodes)
 Michael Keogh as Jed Seddon; Drug dealer and Lewis' uncle (2 episodes)
 Gary Whitaker as Kevin Hurst; Canteen Assistant (2 episodes)

Guest
 Robert Beck as Terry Appleyard; Stacey's father (1 episode)
 Stuart Graham as Russell Millen; Supply teacher and ex-police officer (1 episode)
 Michelle Holmes as Lyndsay Woodham; Headteacher candidate for Waterloo Road (1 episode)
 Jack O'Connell as Dale Baxter; Pupil (1 episode)
 Daisy Wignall as Holly Tattersall; Pupil (1 episode)

Production
Waterloo Road was recommissioned by Shed Productions alongside BBC Scotland for a run of 12 sixty-minute episodes. The series was again set in Rochdale, England, with filming based in the same location and starting in 2006. Regularly, music was taken from the Cornish band Thirteen Senses. Due to copyright issues, some music is unavailable on the DVD release in all regions.

Casting
The second series featured a number of new characters, including new pupil Brett Aspinall (Tom Payne) and his father, the school's prospective governor and investor, Roger Aspinall (Nick Sidi), alongside Davina Shackleton (Christine Tremarco), the new school secretary. The series also introduced Zeriozha Burtt-Skeete as pupil Celine Dixon, Holly Matthews as the scheming pupil Leigh-Ann Galloway, Holly Grainger as Stacey Appleyard, a pupil with a dangerous schoolgirl crush and Ellie Paskell as Maxine Barlow, a pupil who is in trouble and who has returned to Waterloo Road.

Episodes

{| class="wikitable plainrowheaders" width="100%"
|-
! style="background-color: #FF52A8; " | No.
! style="background-color: #FF52A8; " | Title
! style="background-color: #FF52A8; " | Directed by
! style="background-color: #FF52A8; " | Written by
! style="background-color: #FF52A8; " | Original air date
! style="background-color: #FF52A8; " | UK viewers(million)
|-

|}

DVD release
The second series of Waterloo Road was released on DVD in the UK on 10 March 2008, published by 2entertain. The set includes all twelve episodes on a four-disc set. The set includes special features, Miss Haydock Reveals All, and Mika's Video Diary. It was released with a "12" British Board of Film Classification (BBFC) certificate (meaning it is unsuitable for viewing by those under the age of 12 years).

Footnotes

References

2007 British television seasons
Waterloo Road (TV series)